Göçkündemirci is a village in the Amasra District, Bartın Province, Turkey. Its population is 228 (2021).

History 
The name of the village is mentioned as Göçkün Demirciler in the records of 1928.

Geography 
The village is 36 km from Bartın city center and 20 km from Amasra town centre.

References

Villages in Amasra District